Norhafiz Zamani bin Misbah (born 15 July 1981) is a Malaysian professional football coach and former player who played as a centre-back. He is a former member of the Malaysia national team. With a calm character and good at controlling the situation in the penalty box, have led him to be compared to compatriot Soh Chin Ann.

Club career

Negeri Sembilan
He made his first appearance in professional football with Negeri Sembilan in 2001.

Pahang
He moved to Pahang with a high-profile transfer after spending many years with Negeri Sembilan. Pahang was delighted with his signing and said 'Zamani is Malaysia's best defender this time'. He made superb performances with his new club. He played in the ASEAN Club Championship with other clubs in Southeast Asia, such as Tampines Rovers.

KL Plus FC
He wants to move to another club after underperformance with Pahang. He said that he wants to move because Pahang have more difficulties after his former teammate, Indra Putra Mahayuddin moved to Selangor. He later transfer to KL PLUS FC.

Return to Negeri Sembilan
Norhafiz joined Negeri Sembilan for the 2011 Liga Super season. After spent 3 seasons playing with Negeri Sembilan, he moved to Kelantan on 2015.

Kelantan
On 1 December 2014, Norhafiz signed to Kelantan for 2015 season after spent 4 seasons playing for Negeri Sembilan. Norhafiz made his Kelantan debut on 1 March 2015 as a substitute in the 69th for Badhri Radzi in a league match lost to Kedah. He made a strong defence partnership with Jonathan McKain. Norhafiz also operated as a defensive midfielder during his time at Kelantan. He made 18 league appearances during his debut season with Kelantan. On 27 December 2016, although the team was having financial problems, he has confirmed to remain with Kelantan for the third season despite offers from other clubs.

Penang
In 2018, he signed a one year contract to play for Penang.

Return again to Negeri Sembilan and retired
Norhafiz return again to Negeri Sembilan and finally retired in 2020.

International career

National team
He was one of the players who won a silver medal at the 2001 SEA Games in Kuala Lumpur.
In 2002, Norhafiz was called up for an international friendly match against Brazil. He also was part of the squad in the 2004 AFF Championship which finished at third place.

He then became the part of the national football team preparing for the 2007 AFC Asian Cup. He was then chosen into the squad of Malaysia 2007 Asian Cup. He only made his first appearance in the Asian Cup in the first group match against China where Malaysia had heavy defeated 1–5. After this run of bad luck, he became one of three senior players to play at the 2007 Merdeka Tournament. With a combination of senior and U-23 players, Malaysia defeated Myanmar 3–1 in the final to win the trophy.

At the 2008 Merdeka Tournament, Norhafiz helped Malaysia reach the final but his missed shot during the penalty shoot-out against Vietnam lost Malaysia the match.

At November 2010, Malaysia coach, K. Rajagopal called up Norhafiz for the 2010 AFF Suzuki Cup, but he was injured during the 2010 Asian Games and replaced by Razman Roslan.

Malaysia XI
Norhafiz also appeared for the Malaysia League XI. He was selected by coach as defender in the Malaysia squad in a preseason friendly against Manchester United. At the inaugural Premier League Asia Trophy that involved two more English clubs Birmingham City and Newcastle United. After losing to Chelsea in the opening game, Malaysia contested for the 3rd place against Birmingham City. After the game which Malaysia lost, then manager of Birmingham City, Steve Bruce) was asked to single out a Malaysian player which had impressed him, his answer was Norhafiz Zamani Misbah. He featured and captained the Malaysia XI in the 2 matches friendly against Manchester United in July 2009. On 21 July 2011, Norhafiz captained Malaysia League XI match against Chelsea. Malaysia League XI later lost 0–1 on that match.

Managerial career
On 1 February 2021, Norhafiz was hired to become assistant coach for Mokhtar Dahari Academy to aid producing quality young players from the grassroots development program.

Career statistics

Club statistics

International
.

International goals

Honours

Club
Negeri Sembilan
Malaysia FA Cup: 2003
Malaysia Cup: 2011
Charity Cup: 2012; runner-up 2004
Pahang
Malaysia Super League: runner-up 2005
Malaysia FA Cup: 2006
ASEAN Club Championship: runner-up 2005
Kelantan
Malaysia FA Cup: runners up 2015

Individual
FAM Football Awards
Best Defender: 2011

References

External links
 
 Norhafiz Zamani Misbah at Football Malaysia

1981 births
Living people
Malaysian people of Malay descent
Malaysian footballers
Malaysia international footballers
2007 AFC Asian Cup players
People from Malacca
Negeri Sembilan FA players
Sri Pahang FC players
Kelantan FA players
Malaysia Super League players
Association football defenders
Footballers at the 2002 Asian Games
Footballers at the 2006 Asian Games
Footballers at the 2010 Asian Games
Asian Games competitors for Malaysia